Soğanlı railway station is a freight station near the village of Soğanlı in the Kars Province of Turkey.

Railway stations in Kars Province
Railway stations opened in 1913
1913 establishments in the Russian Empire